Morgan's Passing is a 1980 novel by Anne Tyler.  It won the 1980 Janet Heidinger Kafka Prize for Fiction and was nominated for both the American Book Awards and the National Book Critics Circle Award.

Plot summary
Morgan Gower is a middle-aged husband and father who works at Cullen's Hardware Store. Morgan's life is boring: His house is dominated by his wife and daughters who generally ignore him, and his workplace is too slow for his active mind, his wit, and his imagination.  In short, his life has fallen far short of his heroic aspirations, and he keeps a closet full of costumes—priest, riverboat gambler, Daniel Boone outfits—donning a different costume nearly every day, wandering the streets of Baltimore, a man in search of an identity in which he feels comfortable.

One day, he meets a young couple, Emily and Leon Meredith, performing their puppet show in public. Emily goes into labor right after the show, and Morgan (posing as Doctor Morgan) delivers the baby in the backseat of his car. Over the next couple of years, an increasingly bored Morgan frequently runs into the couple "accidentally on purpose."  He stalks them and over a period of time becomes their friend. Leon and Emily are not the happy couple that they appeared to be; Leon is a frustrated actor who has been reduced to a puppeteer.  Emily seems uncertain of what she wants but it isn't Leon. Morgan initially tries to befriend them both (and their daughter Gina) but over several years becomes entranced with Emily. He spends more and more time with his new companions, and his wife and daughters barely notice his absence.  Eventually Emily and Morgan sneak around their spouses, she becomes pregnant by Morgan, and they run off together to a new life, Morgan finally content as he assumes Leon's identity.

Reviews
John Leonard of The New York Times said, "Morgan, like a novelist, wants to be everybody else in order to look at himself through innocent eyes, to be charmed....Miss Tyler, witty, civilized, curious, with her radar ears and her quill pen dipped on one page in acid and on the next in orange liqueur, is asking whether art is adequate to the impersonations life insists on, death absolves. She is a wonderful writer."

In The New York Review of Books, James Wolcott compared Tyler to a "sentry or a detective [who] seems to notice everything: the pale fluorescent gloom of laundromats, pockets filled with lint-covered jellybeans, the smell of crabcakes and coconut oil on a Delaware beach, grapy veins in the calves of middle-aged mothers. As a chronicler of domestic fuss, Tyler can be compared to John Updike."

See also
 John Updike

References

External links

1980 American novels
Alfred A. Knopf books
Novels by Anne Tyler
Novels set in Baltimore